Coretta Scott may refer to:
 Coretta Scott (band), a rock band from Spokane, Washington
 Coretta Scott King, née Coretta Scott, American author, activist, and civil rights leader.